The Philippine scops owl (Otus megalotis) is a common owl, endemic to the Philippines, belonging to the family of the typical owls Strigidae. Other common names include "Otus Whitehead", "Whitehead scops owl" and "Luzon lowland scops owl". Everett's scops owl (Otus everetti) and Negros scops owls (Otus nigrorum) were formerly considered conspecific but are now classified as separate species.

Distinguishing features of these birds include their large upright ears from which they get their specific name megalotis, Ancient Greek for "large ears". Philippine scops owls are relatively small, sedentary birds that are naturally found in the forest understory. There are three subspecies which show variations in morphology and are distributed among different islands of the Philippine Archipelago. They are a monogamous species that offer parental care and construct their nest in tree cavities. These owls are ferocious nocturnal carnivores that feed on insects and small mammals. The IUCN Red List considers this species as Least Concern but they may be vulnerable to deforestation and fragmentation.

Description 
The Philippine scops owl is a fairly small-to-mid-sized species of owl, but is arguably the largest true species of scops owl. A distinguishing feature of this owl is its large ears that stand upright on its head. They also have big eyes that are dark in the center with a red/orange edge. In general, these owls are covered in dark brown feathers with dark streaks. Their ear-tufts also have a similar pattern. Their forehead is whitish and they have a dark line around their facial disc. There are three subspecies of Philippine scops owl which show three variations in morphology. The smallest morph, Otus megalotis nigrorum, has a reddish-brown color, no scapular line, and no feathers on its upper feet. The medium-sized morph, Otus megalotis everetti, also lacks a scapular line and feathers on its upper feet but it has a more greyish-brown color. Finally, Otus megalotis megalotis, is the largest of all three varieties and also has a grey-brown color but it shows a scapular line and feathers on its upper feet. Other morphological differences between the subspecies can be seen in the length of the tail, the wings, the culmen and the tarsus. These traits are longer in O. m. megalotis and are shorter in O. m. nigrorum.

There are no significant differences in morphology between male and female Philippine scops owls, although female scops owls tend to be larger in general. The owlets, however, present some contrast as they have fluffy rufous feathers. Once they reach the sub-adult age, they are black and greyish-white until they finally reach adulthood and turn brownish.

Taxonomy 
The Philippine scops owl belongs to the Strigiformes order and the Strigidae family (typical owls). The Strigidae family is the largest of the two families of owls and shows a great diversity, with species ranging from 40g to 40kg. Key features that distinguish owls of this family from their closest relatives (Tytonidae family) are their large eyes and the fact that their facial disk is circular and not heart-shaped. Otus megalotis is further classified into the Striginae subfamily according to skull morphology. The Otus genus (scops owls) is one of the largest owl genera, counting approximately 50 species, yet these species are one of the smallest in size. They are all found in the Old World with the exception of one species, the flammulated owl, which is found in North America. A distinguishing feature between this genus and other genera of the Striginae subfamily is vocalization.

The Philippine scops owl is endemic to the Philippine Archipelago. This group of approximately 7,000 islands is prone to speciation and is a great location to study phylogeography. It was formed around 30-35 million years ago and lead to the evolution of different subspecies of Otus megalotis. The expansion and contraction of biomes during the last glaciation period as well as the topography in that area lead to isolation of individuals which eventually caused speciation. There are seven Otus species in the Philippines, 5 of which are endemic to islands in the archipelago. These species include Otus longicornis, Otus mindorensis, Otus mirus, Otus megalotis and Otus fuliginosus. The other two species, Otus mantananensis and Otus elegans are not endemic to the Philippines. The three Otus megalotis subspecies are distributed among different islands of the Philippine Archipelago which suggests they could have evolved through speciation from geographic isolation.

Habitat and distribution 
Rainforests, mature secondary woodland forests and forest edges are typical habitats in which Philippine scops owls can be found. They are mostly observed in the understory and rarely go above 1000m altitudes, with the exception of individuals which were reported on Mount Data, Luzon. Researchers caught a Philippine scops owl in a net set up at 2m above ground during their study, which confirms that they are mostly an understory arboreal species. 

Otus megalotis is endemic to the Philippine Archipelago but the three subspecies are distributed in different locations across the archipelago. O. m. megalotis species is found mostly in the northern islands such as Luzon, Marinduque and Catanduanes. O. m. everetti species exists in the eastern and southern islands including Samar, Biliran, Leyte, Mindanao and Basilan. Finally, O. m. nigrorum species is endemic to Negros Island. These subspecies are not known to migrate and therefore have a limited distribution.

Although they are classified as a species of Least Concern, habitat destruction from deforestation and fragmentation is a major threat to their population as they depend on forests for their survival.

Behaviour 
Philippine scops owls are sedentary birds with a limited home range. The fact that different subspecies are found on different islands limits intraspecific competition and allows these birds to have a smaller distribution where all the necessary resources are available.

Vocalizations 
Philippine scops owls are a nocturnal species and vocalize more actively at night. Their song corresponds to "oik oik oik ook" with long and powerful notes that are clearly distinguished from one another. The last "ook" is lower than the previous three notes. Their call sounds completely different with a series of three to six escalating notes that are loud and abrupt. From what is known, there is no difference between the call and the songs of females, males and juveniles.

Diet 
These carnivorous owls prey upon animals such as insects and small mammals. During nighttime, they perch in trees where the land is relatively open, which offers them a better view of the surrounding preys. They are ferocious feeders and specialize in tearing flesh. Their raptorial claws, curved bill and excellent hearing and sighting skill make them powerful predators. They have been observed to kill their victim by crushing its head, then breaking every other bone of the body to finally swallow the animal whole. This method has cost the lives of many juveniles who suffocate because the prey is too large to swallow. Philippine scops owls were also noticed to feed on spider species such as Heteropoda venatoria.

Reproduction 
Otus megalotis is often spotted alone but has also been seen in monogamous pairs. Not a lot of information is known about their reproduction but they are thought to breed throughout the year where females will lay 1 or 2 eggs annually. Sexual maturity is reached around the age of 2 but their lifespan is unknown. One juvenile with two adults have been witnessed multiple times, which supports the notion that they are monogamous birds that display care by both parents. 

They construct their nests in tree cavities but also among the roots of dead trees on the ground.

Gallery

References

Philippine scops owl
Endemic birds of the Philippines
Philippine scops owl
Philippine scops owl